Nothing to Lose is the twelfth book in the Jack Reacher series written by Lee Child. It was published in the UK by Bantam Press in March 2008 and in the US by Delacorte in June 2008. It is written in the third person.

Plot summary
As described by Sherryl Connelly of the New York Daily News,

Similarities to First Blood
Nothing to Lose features several similarities to David Morrell's 1972 novel, First Blood, including the fact that the lead character (a former soldier) is mistaken for a loiterer and harassed by local law enforcement.
The name of the town in both novels is "Hope" and the theme of corrupt and bullying authority is also shared.

Morrell's novel was popular in its time and was the inspiration for the hugely successful 1982 film First Blood starring Sylvester Stallone, released to international acclaim.

Style
Andy Martin of The Independent described the writing of the main character to be like "the great Philip Marlowe pulp tradition, nuanced with a dash of Rambo and Bruce Willis."

Critical reception
Peter Millar of The Sunday Times found the novel to be "as gripping and readable as any in the Reacher series", though he considered the main character to be a "socially dysfunctional, second-rate Superman". Henry Sutton in The Daily Mirror wrote that the novel is another example of Child's "brilliantly paced plots".

References

External links
 Nothing To Lose information page on Lee Child's official website.

2008 British novels
English novels
Jack Reacher books
Third-person narrative novels
Bantam Press books